Bagrat II (died 966) was a Georgian prince of the Bagratid dynasty of Tao-Klarjeti and hereditary ruler of Upper Tao, with the title of eristavt-eristavi, "duke of dukes", from 961 to 966.

Bagrat was a son and successor of Adarnase II Kuropalates. Details of his brief rule are not known. The 10th-century Georgian hagiography Vita of Grigol Khandzteli by Giorgi Merchule mentions him as a man of letters and builder of churches. He died without issue, being succeeded by his brother David III.

References

Bagrationi dynasty of Tao
Grand dukes of Tao
966 deaths
10th-century rulers in Asia
Year of birth unknown
Calligraphers from Georgia (country)